Dobře situovaný pán  is a 1939 Czech film, directed by Miroslav Cikán. It stars Jaroslav Marvan, Antonie Nedošinská, and Věra Ferbasová.

References

External links
Dobře situovaný pán  at the Internet Movie Database

1939 films
Czechoslovak romantic drama films
Films directed by Miroslav Cikán
Czech romantic drama films
1930s romance films
Czech black-and-white films
1930s Czech films